Thomas Freeman (1919 – June 6, 2020) was an American lecturer in religion, a preacher, and a debate coach. His students included Martin Luther King Jr., U.S. Congresswoman Barbara Jordan, and Denzel Washington.

According to his New York Times obituary on June 17, 2020, Freeman was associated with the Texas Southern University debate team that "rose to national prominence". It was founded by Freeman in 1949. Freeman led the team for more than 60 years and he also served as a visiting professor at Morehouse College.

References

External links 
 Thomas F. Freeman Collection of home movies at the Texas Archive of the Moving Image

Texas Southern University faculty
African-American educators
African-American centenarians
Men centenarians
1919 births
2020 deaths
African-American Christian clergy
20th-century African-American people
21st-century African-American people